Colenbrander is a Dutch surname. It may refer to:

 Antonius Colenbrander, a Dutch Olympic horse rider 
 Guus van Hecking Colenbrander (1887–1945), a Dutch soccer player
 Herman Theodoor Colenbrander, a Dutch historian
 Johan(nes) Wilhelm Colenbrander (1855 – 1918), Natal born colonial official and soldier 
 Theo Colenbrander (1841–1930), Dutch architect, ceramist, plaque painter, and designer